Somewhere Down the Road is the seventeenth studio album by Christian music and pop music singer-songwriter Amy Grant, released in 2010. It is a unique album featuring eight new songs, a new recording of the song "Arms of Love", from her 1982 album Age to Age, and rounded out with three of Grant's previously released story-songs.

The album title is taken from the title track, "Somewhere Down the Road" also a promotional single from Grant's 1997 album Behind the Eyes. The song was originally also featured on the first and only commercial single from Behind the Eyes, "Takes a Little Time". The painting featured on the cover of the album includes a painting by Grant, with the inscription Somewhere Down the Road. Grant gave the original painting as a gift to her friend and publicist Jennifer Cooke.

Most of the new songs on the album were recorded in the new studio that Grant and her husband Vince Gill recently had built into their home. One of the songs on the album, "Overnight", is a duet recorded with Sarah Chapman, Grant's daughter. Grant wrote "Unafraid" about her mother.

Roughly one year after the original release of the album a digital-only expanded edition of the album was released with additional material. The expanded edition includes the video for "Better Than a Hallelujah", the first single from the album, as well as an Ambient Mix of the song. Also included on the expanded edition is a cover of the Pete Seeger song "Turn, Turn, Turn" and two remixes of the song "Overnight" (the Aircandy Mix and the Dyna Mix).

Track listing

Personnel 
 Amy Grant – lead vocals, backing vocals (1), acoustic guitar (9, 10)
 Dan Muckala – track programming (1, 2), arrangements (1, 2)
 Tim Lauer – Wurlitzer keyboard (3), keyboards (6)
 Carl Marsh – Fairlight euphonium (3), string arrangements (12)
 Ian Fitchuk – keyboards (5), acoustic piano (5), acoustic guitar (5), bass (5, 8), drums (5, 8), Rhodes piano (8), percussion (8)
 Matt Rollings – acoustic piano (7)
 Phil Madeira – Hammond B3 organ (7)
 Greg Morrow – acoustic piano (9), drums (9), percussion (9)
 Ben Strano – Hammond B3 organ (9)
 John Hobbs – acoustic piano (11), organ (11)
 Pete Wasner – keyboards (11)
 Bernie Herms – acoustic piano (12)
 Tim Akers – Hammond B3 organ (12)
 Adam Lester – acoustic guitar (1, 2),  electric guitar (1, 2)
 Gordon Kennedy – electric guitar (3, 6, 7)
 Wayne Kirkpatrick – acoustic guitar (3, 6, 7), hi-string guitar (3), hammered dulcimer (3), backing vocals (3), harmonica (6)
 Jerry McPherson – electric guitars (3), keyboard bassoon (3)
 Greg Leisz – pedal steel guitar (3)
 Brent Mason – guitars (4)
 Justin Loucks – electric guitars (5), drums (5, 8), percussion (8)
 Kenny Greenberg – electric guitar (6)
 Calvin Turner – guitar (8)
 John Jorgenson – guitars (9)
 Billy Panda – acoustic guitar (9),  octave mandolin (9)
 Tom Hemby – guitar (11)
 Rivers Rutherford – acoustic guitar (12)
 Chuck Butler – bass (2)
 Jimmie Lee Sloas – bass (3, 6)
 Jackie Street – bass (7)
 Mike Brignardello – bass (9)
 David Hungate – bass (11)
 Michael Rhodes – bass (12)
 John Hammond – drums (3)
 Chris McHugh – drums (6, 7)
 Chad Cromwell – drums (11)
 Dan Needham – drums (12)
 Sam Bacco – percussion (3, 6)
 Chris Carmichael – string arrangements and performance (4)
 The London Session Orchestra – strings (12)
 Sarah Chapman – lead vocals (2)
 Gail Mayes – backing vocals (4)
 Angela Primm – backing vocals (4)
 Jenny Gill – backing vocals (5, 11)
 Peter Groenwalk – backing vocals (5)
 Jeremy Lister – backing vocals (5)
 Leigh Nash – backing vocals (5)
 Mindy Smith – backing vocals (5)
 Michael Mellett – backing vocals (6)
 Chris Rodriguez – backing vocals (6, 7)
 Micah Wilshire – backing vocals (6)
 Billy Gaines – backing vocals (7)
 Donna McElroy – backing vocals (7)
 Perry Coleman – backing vocals (9)
 Vince Gill – backing vocals (11), electric guitar (12), harmony vocal (12)

Production 
 Amy Grant – executive producer, cover painting, liner notes, producer (4, 9)
 Jennifer Cooke – executive producer
 Bryan Ward – executive producer
 Dan Muckala – producer (1, 2), engineer (1, 2), mixing (1, 2)
 Wayne Kirkpatrick – producer (3, 6, 7, 10)
 Mike Brignardello – producer (4, 9)
 Greg Morrow – producer (4, 9)
 Ian Fitchuk – producer (5, 8)
 Justin Loucks – producer (5, 8), engineer (5, 8), mixing (5, 8)
 Vince Gill – producer (11)
 Brown Bannister – producer (12)
 Drew Bollman – engineer (1, 11)
 Dan Marnien – engineer (3, 6, 7), mixing (3, 6, 7)
 Ben Strano – engineer (4, 9)
 Dan Deurloo – assistant engineer (1, 2)
 Jed Hackett – additional engineer (4), digital editing (4)
 Scott Velazco – assistant engineer (9)
 Steve Blackman – second engineer (11)
 Russ Long – mixing (4)
 John Hardy – mixing (9)
 David Schober – mixing (11)
 Bob Ludwig – mastering at Gateway Mastering (Portland, Maine)
 Jamie Lynne Neeck – A&R administration
 Jan Cook – art direction
 Beth Mathews – art direction
 Alexis Goodman – package design
 Kristin Barlowe – back cover photography

Charts

Weekly charts

Year-end charts

References

External links
 Amy Grant, "Somewhere Down the Road" by Billboard

Amy Grant albums
2010 albums
Albums produced by Brown Bannister
Sparrow Records albums
Capitol Records albums